The Statute of the Court of Justice of the European Union (C 83/210) contains the main EU law rules on how the Court of Justice of the European Union should function.

See also
EU law

External links
Statute of the Court

Court of Justice of the European Union